The 2022 Vermont Attorney General election took place on November 8, 2022, to elect the next attorney general of Vermont. Former Democratic Attorney General T.J. Donovan resigned after three terms in office. Susanne Young, appointed by Governor Phil Scott to fill the vacancy left by Donovan, is not running for a full term, and Vermont Republicans nominated Mike Tagliavia to run against Charity Clark, the Democratic candidate.

Republican primary

Candidates

Withdrew after winning primary
H. Brooke Paige, newsstand owner and perennial candidate

Replacement nominee
Mike Tagliavia, retired businessman

Declined
Christina Nolan, former U.S. Attorney for the District of Vermont (ran for U.S. Senate)
Susanne Young, incumbent attorney general

Democratic primary

Candidates

Nominee
Charity Clark, former chief of staff to former Attorney General T.J. Donovan

Eliminated in primary
Rory Thibault, Washington County State's Attorney

Declined
T.J. Donovan, former attorney general
Sarah George, Chittenden County State's Attorney (ran for re-election)
Shap Smith, former Speaker of the Vermont House of Representatives and candidate for lieutenant governor in 2016

Progressive primary

Candidates

Withdrew after winning primary
Elijah Bergman, attorney

General election
Charity Clark was considered to be nearly certain to win and the race was called for her as soon as polls closed. She is scheduled to be Vermont's first elected female Attorney General.

Predictions

See also
Vermont Attorney General

References

External links
Official campaign websites
Charity Clark (D) for Attorney General
Mike Tagliavia (R) for Attorney General

Attorney General
Vermont
Vermont Attorney General elections